This is a list of lists of notable  fictional animals.

Lists by biological category 
Lists of fictional invertebrates
List of fictional arthropods (insects, arachnids and crustaceans)
List of fictional parasites
List of fictional worms
Lists of fictional vertebrates
List of fictional fish
List of fictional frogs and toads
List of fictional reptiles
List of fictional crocodilians
List of fictional dinosaurs and pterosaurs
List of fictional snakes
List of fictional turtles
List of fictional birds
List of fictional birds of prey
List of fictional ducks
List of fictional penguins
Fictional mammals
Fictional carnivorans
List of fictional bears
List of fictional canines (coyotes, jackals, foxes, wolves) 
List of fictional dogs
List of fictional cats and other felines
List of fictional big cats
List of fictional musteloids (Musteloidea other than raccoons and badgers) 
List of fictional badgers
List of fictional raccoons
List of fictional pinnipeds
List of fictional marsupials (kangaroos, wallabies, koalas, opossums, bandicoots, Tasmanian devils)
List of fictional primates (lemurs, monkeys, chimpanzees, gorillas, orangutans, humans)
Lists of characters in a fictional work (mostly people)
List of fictional rabbits and hares
List of fictional rodents (mice, rats, beavers, squirrels, porcupines, etc.)
List of fictional ungulates (cattle, sheep, goats, donkeys, zebras, deer, camels, giraffes, etc.)
List of fictional horses
List of fictional pachyderms (elephants, rhinoceroses, hippopotamuses)
List of fictional pigs
List of miscellaneous fictional animals (mollusks, bats, hyenas, cetaceans, aardvarks, mongooses, hedgehogs, monotremes, sirenians, xenarthrans, salamanders, newts, echinoderms, jellyfish, others)

Lists of biological category alphabetically 

List of fictional arthropods
List of fictional badgers
List of fictional bears
List of fictional big cats
List of fictional birds of prey
List of fictional birds
List of fictional canines
List of fictional cats and other felines
List of fictional crocodiles and alligators
List of fictional dinosaurs
List of fictional dogs
List of fictional ducks
List of fictional fish
List of fictional frogs and toads
List of fictional horses

List of fictional miscellaneous animals
List of fictional marsupials
List of fictional musteloids
List of fictional pachyderms
List of fictional parasites
List of fictional penguins
List of fictional pigs
List of fictional pinnipeds
List of fictional primates
List of fictional rabbits and hares
List of fictional raccoons
List of fictional reptiles
List of fictional rodents
List of fictional snakes
List of fictional turtles
List of fictional ungulates
List of fictional wolves
List of fictional worms

Lists by features 
List of anthropomorphic animal superheroes

Lists by fictional work 

List of A Bug's Life characters
List of characters in the Ice Age films
List of Littlest Pet Shop (2012 TV series) characters
List of My Little Pony: Friendship is Magic Characters
List of Star Wars creatures
List of Who Framed Roger Rabbit characters

See also 
Lists of fictional species
List of fictional extraterrestrials